The Chonburi provincial government is divided into three systems of local government: provincial and local government. Pattaya as Thailand's largest tourist-oriented city, has a special local government.

Chonburi provincial government

Chonburi province, with a registered population as of 31 December 2019 of 1,558,301, is led by a governor and is divided into 11 districts (amphoe). Each district is led by a districts chief (nai amphoe). Governor, district chiefs and district clerks are appointed by the central government. There are 92 subdistricts (tambon) each led by a subdistrict chief (kamnan), further divided into 711 villages (muban) each led by a village chief (phu yai ban). Subdistrict chiefs and village chiefs are elected by local citizens.

Mueang Chonburi district

Ban Bueng district

Nong Yai district

Bang Lamung district

Phan Thong district

Phanat Nikhom district

Si Racha district

Ko Si Chang district

Sattahip district

Bo Thong district

Ko Chan district

Pattaya City special local government

Pattaya City Administrative Organisation is a special local government since 30 October 1978. The executive branch is led by the Mayor of Pattaya (Nayok Mueang Pattaya) and the legislative branch is led by the Council of Pattaya (Sapha Mueang Pattaya). The Mayor of Pattaya and the Councillors of Pattaya are directly elected by the citizens of Pattaya. There is no subdivision of Pattaya City Administrative Organisation. But there are 42 communities, although not directly chosen, which have an advisory role.

Pattaya city

Chonburi local government

There is one Chonburi Provincial Administrative Organisation - CPAO ( - อบจ.ชลบุรี oh bo tjo.chonburi). There are 49 municipalities, which are divided into 2 city municipalities (thesaban nakhon), 10 town municipalities (thesaban mueang) and 37 subdistrict municipalities (thesaban tambon). Further for the local communities, which are not connected to a thesaban, there are 46 subdistrict administrative organisations - SAO (ongkan borihan suan tambon). All mayors, chiefs and councillors are directly elected by the local citizens. Municipalities have communities (chumchon), although not directly chosen by the local citizens, which provides advice and recommendations to local administrative organisations. They also promote and support community participation and enterprises at the district level and subdistrict villages.

Mueang Chonburi district

Ban Bueng district

Nong Yai district

Bang Lamung district

Phan Thong district

Phanat Nikhom district

Si Racha district

Ko Si Chang district

Sattahip district

Bo Thong district

Ko Chan district

Notes
The majority of the information for this wiki-article is based on "Population year 2019" from Bureau of the Registration Administration (BORA). Reference date is December 2019.

References

Provinces of Thailand